The Broad Run–Little Georgetown Rural Historic District encompasses a large rural landscape in northeastern Fauquier County, Virginia, and a small portion of neighboring Prince William County, Virginia. It is roughly divided by the John Marshall Highway (Virginia State Route 55), and is bounded on the west by The Plains, the east by the Bull Run Mountains, and the south by Pignut Mountain.

The district was listed on the National Register of Historic Places in 2016.  It includes two individually listed properties: Heflin's Store, and the Beverley Mill.

Gallery

See also
National Register of Historic Places listings in Fauquier County, Virginia
National Register of Historic Places listings in Prince William County, Virginia

References

External links

Historic districts in Fauquier County, Virginia
National Register of Historic Places in Fauquier County, Virginia
Historic districts in Prince William County, Virginia
National Register of Historic Places in Prince William County, Virginia
Historic districts on the National Register of Historic Places in Virginia